The Palais Preysing is a late-Baroque mansion in Munich, southern Germany, which served as residence for the Counts of Preysing. To distinguish it from the nearby Palais Neuhaus-Preysing, it is also called the Elder Palais Preysing.

Joseph Effner built the mansion between 1723 and 1728 for the Count Johann Maximilian of Preysing opposite to the Residenz. It is Munich's first Rococo style palace. The exterior walls  were embellished with stucco. Since its restoration after the destructions of World War II, the building houses shops and offices but the decorated stairway is open for the public.

Viscardigasse

The mansion is situated behind the Feldherrnhalle at Odeonsplatz, the little alley behind the Palais Preysing connecting the Residenzstrasse and the Theatinerstraße is called Viscardigasse (after Giovanni Antonio Viscardi), but it used to be known by the locals as "Drueckebergergasse". "Drueckeberger" is a German slang expression for someone who tries to avoid his duty. Adolf Hitler ordered that everyone passing the Feldherrnhalle had to give the Nazi salute as they walked by, as a tribute to the Nazi sympathisers who had been killed at that spot in the Beer Hall Putsch of 1923. Many people practised a kind of passive resistance by making a detour down the Viscardigasse, to avoid passing the Feldherrnhalle and having to salute. In the mid-90s, a wavy stripe of gold-colored pavement stones were placed in the Viscardigasse in memorial of this civil resistance.

References

Houses completed in 1728
Baroque palaces in Germany
Preysing
Baroque architecture in Munich
1728 establishments in the Holy Roman Empire